Jallikattu Kaalai is a 1994 Indian Tamil-language film, directed by Manivasagam, starring Prabhu and Kanaka. The film was released on 2 November 1994.

Plot 
Gopalakrishnan works in a mill owned by Sundara Gounder. Radha, Sundara Gounder's daughter, returns to the village after her studies and falls in love with Gopalakrishnan. Loose Gounder is a vicious landlord who has raped many women.

When Sundara Gounder knows about his daughter's love, Sundara Gounder arranges her marriage in a hurry, to a fraud. Before the marriage, her fiancé makes a deal with Loose Gounder: Loose Gounder can spend one night with Radha and can do whatever he wants. Gopalakrishnan then stops the marriage and the fraud is arrested by the police. Sundara Gounder apologises to Gopalakrishnan and Radha marries her lover Gopalakrishnan.

Loose Gounder, who cannot digest that his plan failed, kills one of Gopalakrishnan's calves and the first night is therefore cancelled. One night, Radha sees her husband Gopalakrishnan having a conversation with the flower seller Poovatha. When Radha asks her to explain what happened, Poovatha lies to her that she had sexual intercourse with her husband Gopalakrishnan prior to their marriage.

At their first night, Gopalakrishnan clarifies that Poovatha had lied, but Radha does not believe him and Gopalakrishnan challenges her to prove her wrong right away. Poovatha was actually forced to lie because Loose Gounder raped her in the past and he had promised Poovatha to marry her. Thereafter, Loose Gounder kills Poovatha in her house and at that time, Gopalakrishnan comes to her house. Radha, who secretly followed him after the quarrel, believes that Gopalakrishnan killed Poovatha.

Gopalakrishnan eventually finds the culprit, but in the meantime, Loose Gounder kidnaps him and his wife. The film ends with Loose Gounder being killed by Gopalakrishnan's cow, the mother of the killed calf.

Cast 

Prabhu as Gopalakrishnan
Kanaka as Radha
Anandaraj as a Loose Gounder
Shenbagam as Poovatha
Goundamani as Aarusamy, (Gopalakrishnan's uncle)
Senthil as Punnakku
Manorama as Subbulakshmi, Gopalakrishnan's mother
Malaysia Vasudevan as Sundara Gounder, Radha's father
Suryakanth
Prasanna Kumar as Astrologer
Shoban
Sangeetha as Vijayalakshmi (Radha's mother)
Ragasudha
Shakeela as Pushpavanam
Karuppu Subbiah
Pasi Narayanan
Thiruppur Ramasamy
Chitraguptan

Soundtrack 
The music was composed by Deva, with lyrics written by Kalidasan.

Reception 
K. Vijiyan of the New Straits Times described it as "tedious" and wrote that "it did not live up to expectations". The Indian Express wrote, "Its the oft-repeated story [..] The situations are routine and scenes clichéd."

References

External links 
 

1990s Tamil-language films
1994 films
Films directed by Manivasagam
Films scored by Deva (composer)